Juan Ximénez or Juan Jimenez (active 1499 – 1510s) was a Spanish painter.

Little is known of his life except that he was the son of the painter Miguel Ximénez and assisted him and probably several other painters on a large altarpiece in the church of Tamarite de Litera near Huesca. A single outer panel by his hand from that altarpiece survives that was removed from the church before 1917, but the rest of the altarpiece was destroyed in the Spanish civil war.

References

1470 births
1510 deaths
Spanish Renaissance painters